Robert Stewart Trump (August 26, 1948 – August 15, 2020) was an American businessman and investor. He was the younger brother of former U.S. President Donald Trump.

Early life and education

Robert Trump was born in Queens, New York City, on August 26, 1948, to Fred Trump and Mary Anne MacLeod. He was the youngest of their five children; his siblings were Maryanne, Fred Jr., Elizabeth, and Donald. He graduated from St Paul's School in Garden City, Long Island. Trump attended Boston University, where he majored in economics; while there, he played soccer and was the MVP and team captain in 1969.

Career
Trump joined his father's business and came to manage the Trump Organization's real estate holdings outside of Manhattan.

Following Mark G. Etess's death in an October 10, 1989, helicopter crash on a Garden State Parkway median in Lacey Township, New Jersey, Donald Trump appointed Robert Trump to serve in Etess's former position. Etess had been the top executive at the Trump Taj Mahal, Robert Trump's special sporting events coordinator, and was the master of super deals in sports and entertainment for Donald Trump.

He served on the board of directors for ZeniMax Media, parent company to Bethesda Softworks, a position he occupied from 1999 until his death in 2020. During his tenure as a director, ZeniMax published several series, including Fallout, The Elder Scrolls, Doom, and Wolfenstein. His role at the company was highlighted by media outlets in the wake of the Parkland school shooting, when his brother linked video games to violence and subsequently met with various industry chiefs, including Robert Altman, CEO of ZeniMax. In addition to being a board member at ZeniMax, Trump was also an investor in the company.

In the years prior to his death, Robert Trump was the president of Trump Management, a business owned by the Trump siblings, including Donald and Robert, as well as their sisters Maryanne Trump-Barry and Elizabeth Trump-Grau. At some point, Trump worked as a real estate developer.

Mary Trump book lawsuit

In June 2020, Robert Trump filed a lawsuit seeking to preclude the upcoming publication of the book by his niece, Mary L. Trump, Too Much and Never Enough. Trump's lawsuit was based on a 2001 confidentiality agreement Mary Trump signed in settling a lawsuit related to her grandfather, Fred Trump's, will and estate.

Justice Hal B. Greenwald of the New York Supreme Court ruled in July 2020 that the book's publisher, Simon & Schuster, was not a party to the 2001 NDA, and its rights to publish the book were not restricted by that agreement. Greenwald affirmed that Mary Trump's contract with the publisher gave her no ability to halt publication at that point. The book was published as scheduled on July 14, 2020.

Personal life
Robert Trump lived in Millbrook, New York. In 1984, Trump married Blaine Beard, whom he met at a Christie's fundraiser. He had a stepson Christopher Trump-Retchin. The two filed for divorce in 2007, and the divorce was finalized by 2009. Trump married his second wife, Ann Marie Pallan, in January 2020. Robert was a longtime friend of Robert A. Altman.

Relationship with Donald Trump
In 1990, Donald Trump put Robert in charge of the Trump Taj Mahal casino in Atlantic City, New Jersey. The casino experienced significant problems with its grand opening, especially the slot machine financial controls, that took months to rectify. According to Jack O'Donnell, a former Trump Organization executive, at one of the meetings, "Donald Trump screamed at his brother, putting the blame for the slot machine debacle entirely on him."

Robert Trump remained a loyal supporter of his brother's political career. In a 2016 interview, Robert Trump stated: "I support Donald one thousand percent." Fox commentator, Eric Bolling, following Robert's death, had stated that he and his wife Ann Marie Pallan were vigorous supporters of Donald. Trump himself stated on Fox & Friends that he was his biggest fan and would hear about his immense support from others too.

Illness and death
In June 2020, Trump reportedly spent a week in intensive care at Mount Sinai Hospital in Manhattan. On August 14, 2020, the White House announced that he had again been hospitalized with a fatal stroke. Donald Trump visited him that day, later stating that Robert was seriously ill and was "having a hard time". Robert Trump died at NewYork–Presbyterian Hospital in Manhattan the following day, August 15, 2020, at age 71.  The New York Times quoted a family friend as saying that Trump had recently started experiencing intracerebral hemorrhaging after a fall. Mary L. Trump, in an interview with Greenpeace a few days before his death, said that Robert had been sick and hospitalized "a couple of times in the last three months."

In a written statement, Donald Trump said, "He was not just my brother, he was my best friend." A funeral service was held for Robert on August 21, 2020, in the East Room attended by 150 guests. This was the first time in almost a century that a president had held a funeral in the East Room. White House officials stated that all expenses would be privately paid by President Trump.

Notes

References

1948 births
2020 deaths
20th-century American businesspeople
21st-century American businesspeople
American investors
American people of German descent
American people of Scottish descent
American real estate businesspeople
American technology chief executives
American video game producers
Boston University Terriers men's soccer players
Businesspeople from New York City
People from Millbrook, New York
Robert Trump
The Trump Organization employees
Association footballers not categorized by position
Association football players not categorized by nationality